Anna Sophie of Anhalt (15 June 1584 – 9 June 1652) was by birth a member of the House of Ascania and princess of Anhalt. After her marriage, she became Countess of Schwarzburg-Rudolstadt.

Anna Sophie was born in Dessau, the eighth and youngest daughter of Joachim Ernest, Prince of Anhalt, but fourth-born daughter of his second wife Eleonore, daughter of Christoph, Duke of Württemberg.

Life 
In Rudolstadt on 13 June 1613 she married Charles Günther, Count of Schwarzburg-Rudolstadt. Their union was childless.

Anna Sophie was considered as one of the most educated women of her time.  After the death of her husband in 1630 she moved her residence to Kranichfeld and founded there a society that admitted only women, following the example of her brother Louis of Anhalt-Köthen, who was one of the co-founders of the Fruitbearing Society. At the same time, she took the famous educational reformer Wolfgang Ratke under her protection.

Anna Sophie died in Oberkranichfeld.

References 

House of Ascania
1584 births
1652 deaths
German countesses
Daughters of monarchs